Family Man is an album by pianist Jaki Byard recorded in 1978 and released on the Muse label.

Reception
Allmusic awarded the album 3 stars with a review stating, "A typically stimulating and eclectic program of music by Jaki Byard".

Track listing 
All compositions by Jaki Byard except as indicated
 "Just Rollin' Along" - 8:07     
 "Mood Indigo / Chelsea Bridge" (Barney Bigard, Duke Ellington, Irving Mills / Billy Strayhorn) - 6:41     
 "L.H. Gatewalk Rag" - 4:07     
 "Ballad to Louise" - 4:37     
 "Prelude #16" - 3:36     
 "Gaeta" - 4:36     
 "Garr" - 3:21     
 "Emil" - 3:14     
 "John Arthur" - 2:55

Personnel 
Jaki Byard - piano, tenor saxophone, alto saxophone
Major Holley - bass, electric bass, tuba
J. R. Mitchell - drums, timpani, vibraphone
Warren Smith - drums (tracks 5–9)

References 

Jaki Byard albums
1979 albums
Muse Records albums